Bittersweet is the second (and final) studio album by American singer Blu Cantrell, released on June 24, 2003, by Arista Records. The album debuted at number 37 on the US Billboard 200 chart, selling 29,000 units in its opening week, and spawned the commercially successful single "Breathe". Despite not matching the domestic success of previous album So Blu (2001), Bittersweet charted in international markets, unlike Cantrell's debut album, performing modestly in certain European nations. It was nominated for a Grammy Award for Best R&B Album at the 46th Grammy Awards, but lost to Luther Vandross' Dance with My Father.

Track listing

Sample credits
 "Breathe" contains excerpts and samples from "What's the Difference" by Dr. Dre featuring Eminem and Xzibit.
 "Don't Wanna Say Goodbye" contains excerpts and samples from "Cause We've Ended as Lovers" by Syreeta.
 "Round Up" contains replayed elements from "Dueling Banjos", written by Arthur Smith.

Charts

Certifications

Release history

References

2003 albums
Albums produced by Mike City
Albums produced by Soulshock and Karlin
Albums produced by Tricky Stewart
Arista Records albums
Blu Cantrell albums